The Magazine was a monthly digest entertainment magazine targeted for youth and published in Canada. In addition to music, movies, television, and contests, it featured a variety of articles on social issues such as the environment, healthy eating habits, and self-help in cooperation with Kids Help Phone.

On November 1, 2010, The Magazine celebrated its tenth anniversary as a monthly publication.

As of 2015, The Magazine had stopped publication and is now defunct due to low readership and subscription.

History
Community Programs Group, parent company to The Magazine has been producing children's entertainment since 1984. They started out making educational films about subjects such as bicycle safety & rules of the road (Right Riders), first aid, and alcohol and substance abuse (Mr. Finley's Pharmacy, Choose). In 1990, CPG partnered with Marvel to publish Spider-Man comics with drug awareness and safety messages. This became a series of five comics published with Marvel for distribution across Canada by police officers visiting elementary schools while on their safety talks.

In 1993, CPG began a publication called The New Jr. Jays Magazine. This magazine contained was lifestyle tips, Blue Jays facts and a comic strip that represented the diverse culture of the new generation of Canadian kids. The Jr. Jays magazines were given away at Blue Jays games and in schools by police officers. "The publication was considered an "icebreaker" for Police Officers throughout Canada during school visits."

The Jr Jays magazine ran from Spring 1993 right up until Fall 1998, at which point it became known as The Magazine - Not For Adults. The Jr. Jays comic strip continued to run, even though The Mag began to focus more on music, movies, TV and other popular entertainment. The Jr. Jays strip ran until the Fall 2000 edition of The Mag. In November 2000, The Mag started to be published on a monthly basis. It is sold at check-out counters at a variety of stores, such as A&P, Dominion, Foodtown, and 7-Eleven. The company's mission was to give back to the community. The entire cover price of The Mag was donated to the Canadian Association of Chiefs of Police for youth programming and Kids Help Phone.

Literacy and charity remains to be an important part of The Mag's program. A portion of the cover price is regularly donated to Kids Help Phone and various community programs aimed at youth. The September/October 2009 edition marked The Mag's 100th issue.
In April 2011, The Magazine updated its website with a brand new look and archived content.

Comics
The Magazine has a long history of original comic strips which have come and gone over the years. Some of these include:

Catchy-22: This comic was a satirical look at what would happen if a disgraced ex-popstar went after the corrupt and vampiric music industry at a time when they were bogged down in a war with people who download music.
Doomsnight: A comic with strange places, strange people, and a new strange story every month.
Sc ool: This comic strip was the brainchild of Brooks Gray, about the day-to-day antics of D and his school friends.

As of February 2010, The Magazine does not print any comics. Instead, comics are available for reading on the online magazine.

The Magazine Online
The Magazine's official website included many features for its readers, most notably the MagBoard and the Blog. The MagBoard was a message board where members can post about a variety of topics. Comics, games, and wallpapers were available of the website. The board's most popular topic, TPAM, reached its 1000th page on 24 February 2010.

References

Children's magazines published in Canada
Magazines established in 1998
Magazines published in Toronto
1998 establishments in Ontario
Monthly magazines published in Canada
Defunct magazines published in Canada
2015 disestablishments in Ontario
Magazines disestablished in 2015
Entertainment magazines published in Canada